Give Me the Future is the fourth studio album by British indie pop band Bastille, released on 4 February 2022 through EMI Records. It was executive produced by Ryan Tedder. The album was preceded by the singles "Distorted Light Beam", "Give Me the Future", and "Thelma + Louise", and subsequently announced alongside the release of the fourth single "No Bad Days". A fifth single titled "Shut Off the Lights" launched nearly three weeks prior to album release.

A deluxe version of the album was released on 7 February 2022. It includes the single "Survivin'” from their 2020 Goosebumps EP. Bastille toured the UK and Europe starting in April 2022 in support of the album. A Super Deluxe version of the album entitled Give Me The Future + Dreams Of The Past was released on 26 August 2022, split into 3 "paths": Give Me The Future, Dreams Of The Past, and Other People's Heartache, which includes fourteen new tracks and is the fifth installment into Bastille's series of mixtapes, Other People's Heartache.

Background
Dan Smith had a plan for the album prior to the beginning of the COVID-19 pandemic in early 2020, but the album took on more "prescient" themes as it was primarily worked on during the subsequent lockdowns. Smith said that "what is real and what is not has become pretty difficult to discern sometimes. We're in the age of deep fake, fake news and lying world leaders". The album has been characterised as pairing "tech-heavy themes with glistening, ambitious pop music", as well as "a tribute to humanity in a tech age" that "reflects on the strangeness of living through times that can feel like science fiction".

The album also includes a spoken-word interlude narrated by British actor and rapper Riz Ahmed titled "Promises".

Track listing

Notes

 "Survivin'" is stylized in lowercase.

Personnel
Bastille
 Dan Smith – vocals (1–3, 5–13), keyboards (1–3, 5, 6, 8–13), programming (4, 7, 12)
 Kyle Simmons – background vocals (1, 8), computer music voices (1), keyboards (2, 5, 8)
 Will Farquarson – guitar (2, 5, 8), background vocals (8), bass (8, 11)
 Chris Wood – background vocals, drums (5, 8)

Additional musicians

 Marty Maro – bass, drums, guitar, keyboards, programming (1)
 Dan Priddy – keyboards, programming (1–3, 5, 9, 10); background vocals (8)
 Mark Crew – keyboards (1–3, 5, 8–11, 13), programming (1–3, 5, 8, 9, 11, 13), guitar (11)
 Jonny Abraham – string arrangement (1, 4–6, 10, 12), trumpet (5, 8, 10)
 Llinos Richards – cello (1, 4–6, 10, 12)
 Jordan Bergmans – viola (1, 4–6, 10, 12)
 Ciara Ismail – violin (1, 4–6, 10, 12)
 Rosie Langley – violin (1, 4–6, 10, 12)
 Bim Amoake-Gyampah – background vocals (2), vocals (13)
 Charlie Barnes – guitar (2, 5, 8, 10), background vocals (8)
 Jack Duxbury – guitar (2, 3, 5, 11, 13), piano (3); keyboards, programming (13)
 John Rittipo-Moore – saxophone (5, 8, 10), background vocals (8)
 Barnaby Philpott – trombone (5, 8, 10)
 Riz Ahmed – spoken word (7)
 Adam Foster – background vocals (8)
 Chris Speirs – background vocals (8)
 Dick Meredith – background vocals (8)
 Lisa O'Callaghan – background vocals (8)
 Paul Cooper – background vocals (8)
 Jonny Coffer – guitar, programming (8)
 May Charters – spoken word (9)
 Jack Scott – whistle (11)
 Senab Adekunle – background vocals, vocal arrangement (13)

Technical
 Chris Gehringer – mastering
 Mark "Spike" Stent – mixing (1–6, 8–11, 13)
 Mark Crew – mixing (7, 12), recording (1–6, 8–13)
 Rich Rich – recording (1)
 Riz Ahmed – recording (7)
 Jonny Coffer – recording (8)
 Matt Wolach – mixing assistance (1–6, 8–11, 13)

Charts

References

2022 albums
Albums produced by Ryan Tedder
Bastille (band) albums
EMI Records albums